Foveades is a genus of moths of the family Erebidae. The genus was erected by George Thomas Bethune-Baker in 1908.

Species
Foveades aroensis Bethune-Baker, 1908 New Guinea, Queensland
Foveades bisectalis (Wileman, 1915) Formosa
Foveades squamata (Hampson, 1918) Louisiade Archipelago

References

Herminiinae
Moth genera